Gautier is a city in Jackson County, Mississippi, United States, along the Gulf of Mexico west of Pascagoula. It is part of the Pascagoula Metropolitan Statistical Area. The population was 18,572 at the 2010 census, up from 11,681 at the 2000 census. In 2002, Gautier had annexed land more than doubling its area.

Gautier is a bedroom resort community surrounded by bayous and wetlands on three sides. The natural environment of Gautier offers many opportunities for recreation and eco-tourism. The Gulf Coast region, of which Gautier is a part, has been considered a relatively high growth area of the state; however, the loss of houses and jobs after Hurricane Katrina on August 29, 2005 led to outmigration in 2006.

History
The town takes its name from the Gautier family that originated in Lyon, France. Fernando Upton Gautier (1822–1891) was born on a cargo ship as his parents were emigrating to New Orleans. In 1867, Gautier established a spacious homestead at the mouth of the Pascagoula River, which still stands. He established a lucrative sawmill business in the area, and the town grew up from it. The home, known by locals as "The Old Place", is owned by the descendants of Fernando Upton Gautier and his wife, Theresa Fayard Gautier (1828–1911), and is used for private and public events.

Geography
Gautier is located in southern Jackson County along Mississippi Sound of the Gulf of Mexico, at the mouth of the West Pascagoula River, locally known as the "Singing River". The city is bordered to the east by the city of Pascagoula (the Jackson county seat) and to the west by Ocean Springs, and to the north by unincorporated Vancleave.

Interstate 10 passes through the northern part of the city limits, with access from Exit 57 (Mississippi Highway 57) and Exit 61 (Gautier Vancleave Road). I-10 leads west  to the Gulfport area and east  to Mobile, Alabama.

Demographics

2020 census

As of the 2020 United States census, there were 19,024 people, 7,013 households, and 4,577 families residing in the city.

2000 census
As of the census of 2000, there were 11,681 people, 4,260 households, and 3,233 families residing in the city. The population density was 954.2 people per square mile (368.5/km2). There were 4,597 housing units at an average density of 375.5 per square mile (145.0/km2). The racial makeup of the city was 68.19% White, 27.65% African American, 0.51% Native American, 1.28% Asian, 0.04% Pacific Islander, 0.90% from other races, and 1.42% from two or more races. Hispanic or Latino of any race were 3.19% of the population.

There were 4,260 households, out of which 38.1% had children under the age of 18 living with them, 54.9% were married couples living together, 17.1% had a female householder with no husband present, and 24.1% were non-families. 19.3% of all households were made up of individuals, and 4.5% had someone living alone who was 65 years of age or older. The average household size was 2.73 and the average family size was 3.11.

In the city, the population was spread out, with 28.4% under the age of 18, 9.8% from 18 to 24, 30.2% from 25 to 44, 23.3% from 45 to 64, and 8.3% who were 65 years of age or older. The median age was 33 years. For every 100 females, there were 97.9 males. For every 100 females age 18 and over, there were 94.9 males.

The median income for a household in the city was $41,244, and the median income for a family was $46,835. Males had a median income of $33,474 versus $21,622 for females. The per capita income for the city was $17,525. About 15.1% of families and 17.3% of the population were below the poverty line, including 28.4% of those under age 18 and 13.6% of those age 65 or over.

Government
 
The city of Gautier has had a City Manager-Council organizational structure since 1987. Although Hurricane Katrina on August 29, 2005 slowed growth, the population of Gautier is expected to grow at a steady rate during the coming decades. The socio-economic demographics of the city is similar to that of Jackson County in terms of income, age, gender and education, although Gautier has a higher rate of college-educated persons. The income and employment of residents benefits greatly from the proximity of strong employment centers in Jackson County.

Education
Most of Gautier is served by the Pascagoula-Gautier School District. Portions are in the Jackson County School District and in the Ocean Springs School District.

The main secondary school in the city, of the Pascagoula-Gautier district, is Gautier High School, whose doors opened in 1996 and which was awarded blue ribbon status by the Department of Education in 2005. The city is also served by Gautier Middle School, Singing River Academy, and three elementary schools.

The Jackson County Campus of Mississippi Gulf Coast Community College is located in Gautier, as one of four campuses of the community college.

Notable people
 Walter Inglis Anderson, painter and writer
 Mario Edwards Jr., professional football defensive end
 Aaron Jones, professional basketball player
 Margie Joseph, R&B, soul and gospel singer
 Kez McCorvey, former professional football player
 John Read, member of the Mississippi House of Representatives

References

External links
 City of Gautier official website
 Community website (archived)

Cities in Mississippi
Cities in Jackson County, Mississippi
Cities in Pascagoula metropolitan area
Populated coastal places in Mississippi
Populated places established in 1986